Kushmangort is a rural locality (a settlement) in Cherdynsky District, Perm Krai, Russia. The population was 1,069 as of 2010. There are 6 streets.

Geography 
Kushmangort is located 24 km west of Cherdyn (the district's administrative centre) by road. Kolchug is the nearest rural locality.

References 

Rural localities in Cherdynsky District